Xanthoparmelia waboomsbergensis is a species of foliose lichen in the family Parmeliaceae. It was formally described as a new species in 2002 by Australian lichenologist John Elix. The species epithet refers to the type locality, the only place the lichen is known to occur.

Description
The lower thallus surface is black, with simple (i.e., unbranched), black rhizines. Xanthoparmelia waboomsbergensis contains several lichen products: stictic acid and constictic acid as major metabolites, minor amounts of usnic acid, and trace amounts of norstictic acid and cryptostictic acid.

See also
List of Xanthoparmelia species

References

waboomsbergensis
Lichen species
Lichens described in 2002
Lichens of South Africa
Taxa named by John Alan Elix